Bernard Joseph Mehen (September 19, 1918 – May 11, 2007) was an American professional basketball player. He played in the National Basketball League for the Youngstown Bears and Toledo Jeeps and averaged 6.9 points per game. He served in the Army during World War II and suffered a foot injury caused by mortar shell. Bernie's younger brother Dick Mehen played alongside him at both the University of Tennessee and with the Toledo Jeeps.

References

External links
Wheeling, WV Hall of Fame profile

1918 births
2007 deaths
United States Army personnel of World War II
American men's basketball players
Basketball players from West Virginia
Centers (basketball)
Forwards (basketball)
Sportspeople from Wheeling, West Virginia
Tennessee Volunteers basketball players
Toledo Jeeps players
Youngstown Bears players